Richard Vernon Francis Cook (born 1947, Cheltenham, England) is a British painter living and working in Newlyn, Cornwall. Cook has been exhibiting for over twenty five years and has received awards from the British Council and the Arts Council. In 2001 he was given a solo show at Tate St Ives, with a related publication, and a major painting was acquired for the collection in 2006. Further works are held in the British Museum collection.

Early life and education
Cook spent his early childhood in Ceylon, upon his family’s return to England, he attended school in Oxfordshire. Cook went on to study at Saint Martin's School of Art, London (1966–70), and the Royal College of Art, London (1970–73). As a child Cook was passionate about nature and learnt the names of trees, birds, fish and flowers. He spent countless hours near the river and woods in
Oxford where he lived, feeling rooted through his experiences of nature. These are the things he loved as a child and is rediscovering as an artist living in Cornwall.

Collections 
 Tate Gallery, London
 The Arts Council of Great Britain 
 The British Museum, London 
 Manchester City Art Gallery
 Deutsche Bank, London

Selected exhibitions

Solo 
2001: Luminous, Tate St Ives, Cornwall
2003: New Paintings, Austin/Desmond Fine Art, London
2006: Art First, London
2008: Iridescence, Art First, London
2010: Under the Summer, The Exchange, Penzance, Cornwall
2012: With Closed Eyes, Keslte Barton, Manaccan, Cornwall
2016: She lies within my sleep, Felix & Spear, London

Group 
1976: The Human Clay, Hayward Gallery, London
2005: Mixed Doubles, Art First, London
2006: Drawing Inspiration: Contemporary British Drawing, Abbot Hall, Kendal
2007: Art Now, Tate St. Ives
2010: Meetings Of Dreams, The Wills Lane Gallery, St. Ives
2012: Landscape, The Redfern Gallery, London

See also

References

1947 births
Living people
20th-century English painters
21st-century English painters
21st-century English male artists
Alumni of Saint Martin's School of Art
Alumni of the Royal College of Art
English male painters
20th-century English male artists